Singing Skylarks - Music for a cause is a non-governmental organization (NGO) based in Bangalore, India. It was formed in 2006 by  music enthusiasts working for different software firms in Bangalore. Initially, the members were primarily involved in producing music programs for television. Once the band started growing, attracting different artists and volunteers who wanted to contribute towards the society, the NGO increased in size and the team of engineers and musicians started working on different social projects. Projects include the sponsorship of education for Poor and Deserving Students of all standards, Empowering Government Schools, curbing Corruption and Planting trees in and around Bangalore as part of environmental "go green" initiatives.

Singing Skylarks was founded by Venkatesan Subbunarayanan along with a bunch of musicians giving programs to raise funds for the charity. Through word of mouth and articles, Singing Skylarks grew to 100 members in 2009 and started working as a full-time NGO. It was then registered as a non-profit trust on 22 December 2009 with a governing board composed of employees from various software companies.

Singing Skylarks is a 12-A Registered Organization, and all the donations are exempted from tax under Section 80G. Singing Skylarks has obtained prior permissions for FCRA regulations.

Vision

Singing Skylarks aims to make India a country free from illiteracy, poverty, child labor and corruption. Singing Skylarks members visit various villages and outskirts of cities to identify the children who need education. The team strongly believes that every child deserves equal education and proper education will lead the country free from poverty, child labor and corruption. The NGO has worked extensively on providing scholarship for deserving poor children, and aims to provide "education for all" by setting up schools in cities, towns and villages and providing quality education at subsidized cost for poor and deserving children.

Mission

The objectives of Singing Skylarks broadly include the following:
Curbing illiteracy
Curbing poverty
Curbing child labor
Curbing corruption

ACTIVITIES

Education Sponsor Programs

Singing Skylarks covers part of the education expenses for deserving students every year. As part of scholarships, the organisation allocates 1-2 Lakhs INR towards this cause annually. The program started with education sponsorship of a poor girl Deepa, who lost her parents at a young age. The volunteers continued to counsel the girl related to her studies. The progress of the girl was reported periodically and monitored till the year 2010. She is currently employed in a Nationalized bank. Singing Skylarks strongly believes in the empowerment of women and sponsored the higher education of a female security guard in 2011. Her progress was tracked by one of the NGO's volunteers, she is now employed in an accounting firm in Bangalore. All the other students who have  been sponsored till date are monitored continuously for progress and showcased to the donors and this program has been a phenomenal success.

Dance Classes in Government schools 

Singing Skylarks started a project to imparting dance knowledge to students in government schools on 21 August 2010. Not all government schools are able to teach dance or music, and even at those who do, many children cannot learn because of fees charged by teachers.  A Singing Skylarks volunteer who has learned Bharatnatyam for about 10 years started the project and teaches to around 25 students in a government school near the Hebbal flyover in Bangalore.

Singing Skylarks Article on Bangalore CITY BUZZ Magazine

Better Living Conditions

Singing Skylarks learned about a village named Kerethanda which is located in the North Karnataka region in Hospet town. The village lacked even basic amenities, and the school was poorly maintained and without basic materials. Around 20 volunteers from Singing Skylarks from software companies visited the village twice in 2010 to counsel the students and donate books and geometry boxes to the school. Singing Skylarks in Kerethanda Article in DNA newspaper The NGO has also arranged for employment for the youngsters as security guards in the Bangalore area.

Environmental Initiatives

In 2010, Singing Skylarks learned about the problems existing in a lake in Bangalore near Bagmane Tech Park.

With the help of the Defence Research and Development Organisation (DRDO), the Motorola Foundation, and Bagmane Builders, Singing Skylarks completed beautification of the lake, including the installment of a fountain and the planting of about 100 saplings.

Mobile Library Project

Singing Skylarks was presented with the CEO Award for Volunteerism 2009 from the Motorola Foundation, which brought in a grant. The grant is used to sponsor education for children and mobile library projects.

Education Sponsorship Projects

The education sponsorship worth 30000 INR is done until 2011. Two students from the KR Puram area studying in a government school and two students studying in a government school in the Karur area of Tamil Nadu have benefited so far. Singing Skylarks volunteers Zakir and Karthikeyan are spearheading the efforts and will monitor the progress periodically. Along the same lines, a sponsorship of 6000 INR was used during 2011 for the education related activities and higher studies of girl child and women.

The Quest For Knowledge Project (q4K)

Mobile Library 

Singing Skylarks as an NGO, has set up Library for 30 Government schools till date in Bangalore East area.
Volunteers of the organisation with the help of software organisations has gathered close to 4000 books till date benefiting around 2000 students in this area.

All the government schools identified had no Library or Library with least books which were not used much by the students. The program is having a great impact on the students since the volunteers keep visiting each of the schools identified in round robin basis, set up an effective library system and trained the teachers and students to start using the library in an effective manner to gain skills on various subjects such as Maths, Science, Social studies and General Knowledge.

Upliftment Project
Singing Skylarks has planned extend the various activities under its flagship scheme (Mobile Library and Education Sponsorship).
Kerethanda in North karnataka (Introduced transformation over 2 phases with the citizens on the evils of alcoholism and importance of Education and uplifted the government school there).
KR Puram Hobli (Learnt about the necessity to make the environment of the lake than it was in Krishnarajapuram of Bangalore and improved the Sanitation by planting trees around and installing a fountain in the lake).
Adopted Kodumudi in Erode district to introduce spoken English and computer classes to the schools and counseling for the beneficiaries about the importance of these.

Promoting Music and Arts
Singing Skylarks works towards promoting classical music and dance amongst young students and conducts concerts and dance programs every year through Jaagrithi awareness events. Recently, the group has released a music album under the guidance of Lahari Music Label and a total of 20K INR raised is used for education sponsor.

Equal Opportunity For Disabled Persons

Few of the Singing Skylarks volunteers visited the Shrishti Special Academy in Bangalore in 2008 to provide counseling for the physically disabled children. Many volunteers from the group visit the NGO every year to provide support and guidance to the children there.

References
 
 
 Singing skylarks to the rescue of Kere thanda Deccan Herald, (21 September 2010)

Organisations based in Bangalore
2006 establishments in Karnataka
Organizations established in 2006
Music organisations based in India